Ahmad Attellesey (born 30 July 1995) is a Libyan swimmer. He competed in the men's 50 metre freestyle event at the 2016 Summer Olympics where he ranked 53rd with a time of 23.89 seconds. He did not advance to the semifinals. Attellesey holds the national record in 50 metre freestyle and butterfly.

References

External links
 

1995 births
Living people
Libyan male freestyle swimmers
Olympic swimmers of Libya
Swimmers at the 2016 Summer Olympics
Sportspeople from Malmö